It's Only Natural may refer to:

 "It's Only Natural" (song), a 1991 song by Australian/New Zealand rock group Crowded House
 It's Only Natural (Natural album) (2004)
 It's Only Natural (The Higher album) (2009)
 It's Only Natural (The Oak Ridge Boys album) (2011)
 It's Only Natural (Red Hot Chili Peppers album) (2022)